Bénédicte Taurine (born 18 June 1976) is a French politician representing la France Insoumise. She was elected to the French National Assembly on 18 June 2017, representing the department of Ariège.

Biography

Early life
Taurine is a teacher in Life and Earth Sciences at a Secondary School, she also carries out union duties at the National Union of Secondary Education.

Political career
In 2015, she was a candidate for regional elections in Occitanie on the list "New world in common", grouping several parties of radical left, but was not elected.

Member of the National Assembly
She was elected member of the first constituency of Ariège on 18 June 2017 with 50.28% of the votes in the second round under the political banner of La France Insoumise.

In the National Assembly, She sits on the Economic Affairs Committee, and she is a member of Delegation for Women's Rights and Equal Opportunities for Men and Women. She is president of the France-Andorra Friendship Group.

See also
 2017 French legislative election

References

1976 births
Living people
Deputies of the 15th National Assembly of the French Fifth Republic
La France Insoumise politicians
Place of birth missing (living people)
Women members of the National Assembly (France)
21st-century French women politicians
Deputies of the 16th National Assembly of the French Fifth Republic